is a city in Aichi Prefecture, Japan. , the city had an estimated population of 60,206 in 22,576 households, and a population density of 315 persons per km2.

Geography

Tahara is situated in southern Aichi Prefecture, and occupies most of the hilly Atsumi Peninsula. The peninsula is bounded on the north by Mikawa Bay and to the south lies the Enshū Sea. Situated as it is between those two bodies of water, Tahara has a warm maritime climate.

Climate
The city has a climate characterized by hot and humid summers, and relatively mild winters (Köppen climate classification Cfa).

Demographics
Per Japanese census data, the population of Tahara has been relatively steady over the past 60 years.

Neighboring municipalities
Aichi Prefecture
Toyohashi

History

Origin
The area of present-day Tahara has been continuously occupied since prehistoric times.
Archaeologists have found numerous remains from the Jōmon period and burial mounds from the Kofun period.

Ancient history
During the Nara period, the area was assigned to ancient Atsumi County, and was divided into several shōen during the Heian period.

Middle Ages
During the Kamakura period, the area was noted for production of a certain type of pottery.
During the Sengoku period, the area was under the control of the Toda clan, who constructed Tahara Castle.

Early modern period
The Toda, who were allied with Tokugawa Ieyasu were dispossessed by Toyotomi Hideyoshi, but returned as daimyō of Tahara Domain at the start of the Edo period.
The Toda were later replaced by the Miyake clan, who ruled until the end of the Tokugawa shogunate. The noted scholar Watanabe Kazan was from Tahara.

Late modern period
At the start of the Meiji period, on October 1, 1889, Tahara was organized into a number of villages within Atsumi District, Aichi Prefecture with the establishment of the modern municipalities system.
Tahara Village was elevated to town status on October 3, 1892, and Fukue village became Fukue Town on February 22, 1897.

Contemporary history
Fukue later changed its name to Atsumi Town on April 15, 1955.

The city of Tahara was established on August 20, 2003, from the merger the former town of Tahara, absorbing the town of Akabane (both from Atsumi District) to elevate city status. On October 1, 2005, the town of Atsumi (also from Atsumi District) was merged into Tahara. Therefore, Atsumi District was dissolved as a result of this merger.

Government

Tahara has a mayor-council form of government with a directly elected mayor and a unicameral city legislature of 18 members. The city contributes one member to the Aichi Prefectural Assembly.  In terms of national politics, the city is part of Aichi District 15 of the lower house of the Diet of Japan.

External relations

Twin towns – Sister cities

International
Sister city
Georgetown（Kentucky, United States of America）
since April 20, 1990
Princeton（Indiana, United States of America）
since August 8, 2002
Friendship city
Kunshan（Jiangsu, China）
since May 14, 1993
Dongjak-gu（Seoul, Korea）
since December 2006

National
Friendship city
Shitara（Aichi Prefecture, Chūbu region）
since Marchi 24, 1999
Miyata（Nagano Prefecture, Chūbu region）
since November 9, 1999

Economy
Tahara is a regional commercial center with a mixed economy of manufacturing and agriculture. Due to its long coastline, Tahara has many ports for commercial fishing.

Secondary sector of the economy

Manufacturing
The main industrial employer is Toyota Motor Corporation, which has its award-winning Tahara plant in Tahara which makes many Lexus-brand cars and some Toyota models.
The Toyota Celica was manufactured in Tahara from 1979 to 1999.
Many Lexus models are manufactured within this plant, as are many Toyota models for domestic and international markets.

Lifeline

Energy
Tahara has a consortium of companies investing in renewable energy needs.  , a new solar energy and wind energy power generation facility will provide 19,000 households with electricity on an infrequent basis that is dependent upon the weather. JERA operates the Atsumi Thermal Power Station, an oil-fired power plant with capacity of 1400 MW in Tahara.

Education

Schools
Tahara has 18 public elementary schools, five public middle schools operated by the city government and three public high schools operated by the Aichi Prefectural Board of Education.

Transportation

Railways

Conventional lines
 Toyohashi Railroad
Atsumi Line：-  –  –  –

Bus

Bus services
Toyotetsu buses and city-operated environmentally friendly public transport facilitate access throughout Tahara, even to the westernmost point at Cape Irago.

Roads

Japan National Route
 is the main highway that runs the length of Atsumi Peninsula.  An alternate reading of the kanji in this highway numeral designation is ji-go-ku.  In Japanese, the word jigoku means Hell, and thus some locals refer to it as ji-go-ku-douro, or the "Highway to Hell".  This term was encouraged by the perception of a higher fatality rate along the road, especially before it was widened and improved.

Seaways

Seaports
From the Port of Irago, the Ise-wan Ferry connects Tahara with the town of Toba, Mie prefecture.  The ferry can accommodate motor vehicles.  The ferry also docks at the Central Japan International Airport, built on an artificial island in Ise Bay, south of Nagoya.

Local attractions
Yoshigo Shell Midden, a Jōmon period shell midden and National Historic Site
Irago Tōdai-ji Tile Kiln ruins, Kamakura-period kiln ruins, a National Historic Site
Ōarako Old Kiln ruins, a National Historic Site
Site of Tahara Castle
Kojigahama Beach, Cape Irago, the wave sounds of which were listed as one of the 100 Soundscapes of Japan by the Ministry of the Environment 
 Kazan Jinja
 Akabane Long Beach, also known as "Akabane Beach" or "Long Beach", is a very scenic area for locals and tourists. The Akabane Beach hosted the 2018 World Surfing Games, among other international surfing competitions over the years.

Notable people
Watanabe Kazan, Edo period samurai and artist
Noboru Ueda, motorcycle racer

References

External links
 
 
 
   (with link to English pages)

 
Cities in Aichi Prefecture
Port settlements in Japan
Populated coastal places in Japan
Populated places established in 1955